Samuel Bourn (1714–1796) was an English Dissenter minister.

Samuel Bourn may also refer to:

Samuel Bourn the Elder (1648–1719), English dissenting minister
Samuel Bourn the Younger (1689–1754), English dissenting minister

See also
Samuel Bourne (1834–1912), British photographer